Wheat Crunchies are a crisp wheat snack produced under the British snack producer KP Snacks Ltd. They come in several flavours including Spicy Tomato, Crispy Bacon and Cheese & Onion. A regular multipack bag contains 20g and a normal retail pack contains 30g.

History
Wheat Crunchies was acquired by Rowntree Mackintosh in 1982 with their purchase of a 90% stake in Riley's Potato Crisps.

In February 1992, Sooner Snacks was bought from Borden Inc. by Dalgety plc, with the company being absorbed into Golden Wonder. In 1995, Golden Wonder underwent a management buyout costing £54.6 million. In 2000, Bridgepoint Capital acquired Golden Wonder for £156 million. It was subsequently sold to United Biscuits in 2006, following the take-over of Golden Wonder by Tayto, and merged into KP Snacks. In December 2012 KP Snacks was sold to Intersnack.

Re-launch
In June 2012, United Biscuits re-launched Wheat Crunchies with a new logo, 'improved taste', a new Cheddar & Onion flavour, and a bigger snack size.

Health information
The packet promises that the product is free from any artificial colours or flavours and contains no MSG. An average 25g multipack packet contains: Energy (kj)- 516, (kcal)- 123, Protein- 2.4g, Carbohydrate- 14.4g, of which sugars- 0.7g, Fat- 6.3g, of which saturates- 0.9g, Fibre- 0.8g, Sodium- 0.2g

See also
 List of brand name snack foods

References

External links
 United Biscuits
 Golden Wonder Crispy Bacon Wheat Crunchies Reviews

Brand name snack foods
United Biscuits brands
British snack foods